The House of Lords Commission is a select committee of the House of Lords which provides strategic and political direction for the House of Lords Administration. Its remit also includes approving the annual Estimate, overseeing financial support arrangements for peers, and delegate various functions to the Services, Finance, and Audit committees.

The House of Lords Commission replaced the House Committee.

Membership
As of January 2023, the membership of the committee is as follows:

The committee also includes external members who are not peers or members of Parliament, currently Mathew Duncan and Nora Senior.

See also
List of Committees of the United Kingdom Parliament

References

Committees of the House of Lords